The following is a list of confirmed tornadoes confirmed by local offices of the National Weather Service during the tornado outbreak sequence of May 21–26, 2011 that occurred over the Midwestern and Southern United States. After a slow start to May, activity abruptly increased with a prolonged and violent tornado outbreak sequence taking place from May 21–26, resulting in 178 fatalities. An EF3 tornado struck Reading, Kansas on May 21, resulting in severe damage and one fatality. An EF5 tornado in Joplin, Missouri resulted in 158 fatalities on May 22, becoming one of the deadliest tornadoes in United States history. This tornado was the most severe of the outbreak, and it caused catastrophic damage across southern portions of the city of Joplin. Elsewhere on May 22, another person was killed by an EF1 tornado that struck Minneapolis, Minnesota and surrounding suburbs, and a high-end EF3 tornado moved from Delaware County, Oklahoma to McDonald County, Missouri, with numerous homes being destroyed. On May 24, a significant outbreak took place in Oklahoma and Arkansas, with another EF5 tornado and two EF4 tornadoes striking areas around Oklahoma City. These three tornadoes resulting in ten fatalities and nearly 300 injuries. Another EF4 tornado moved through Denning, Arkansas just before midnight, with four additional deaths. May 25 featured a large number of tornadoes across Missouri, Illinois and Indiana, with several more tornadoes in other states. This activity continued into the next day, when an EF3 tornado impacted part of St. Tammany Parish, Louisiana and injured four people. Tornadic activity wound down during the evening of May 26, after several tornadoes moved through Pennsylvania and Ohio, bring the outbreak sequence to a close.

Confirmed tornadoes

May 21 event

May 22 event

May 23 event

May 24 event

May 25 event

May 26 event

Notes

References 

05-21
2011-05-21
2011-05-21
Tornado Outbreak